Pietro Contento Castellitto (born 16 December 1991) is an Italian actor, film director, and screenwriter, son of actor and director Sergio Castellitto and writer Margaret Mazzantini.

Biography
Castellitto began his acting career in the early 2000s, in films directed by his father, such as Don't Move.

In 2020, Castellitto presented his directorial debut, The Predators, at the Horizons section of the 77th Venice Film Festival, where he received the Best Screenplay Award.

Partial filmography

Actor

Director

References

External links

1991 births
Italian film directors
Italian screenwriters
Living people
Male actors from Rome
Sapienza University of Rome alumni
Irish people of Italian descent
Italian people of Irish descent